The Heliasteridae are a family of Asteroidea (sea stars) in the order Forcipulatida. It includes two genera: Heliaster from the East Pacific (California to Chile, including offshore islands), and Labidiaster from southernmost South America, Antarctica and subantarctic oceans.

Genera
The World Register of Marine Species includes two genera and seven species within the family Heliasteridae:
Heliaster Gray, 1840</small>Heliaster canopus Perrier, 1875Heliaster cumingi (Gray, 1840)Heliaster helianthus (Lamarck, 1816)Heliaster kubiniji Xantus, 1860Heliaster microbrachius Xantus, 1860Heliaster polybrachius H.L. Clark, 1907Heliaster solaris A.H. Clark, 1920Labidiaster<small> Lütken, 1872
Labidiaster annulatus Sladen, 1889
Labidiaster radiosus Lütken, 1871

References

 
Echinoderm families